Apis nearctica is an extinct species of honey bee which existed in what is now Nevada during the Middle Miocene period. It was discovered at Stewart Valley, Nevada, and described by Michael S. Engel, Ismael A. Hinojosa-Díaz, and Alexandr P. Rasnitsyn in 2009.

The species belongs to the extinct armbrusteri species group, is most similar to the extinct species Apis armbrusteri from the Miocene of southwestern Germany, and both species may be related by geological range.

This is the first and only known Apis species range in the New World, although it is a fossil. And is the first and only fossil species ranged there.

References

nearctica|†
Prehistoric insects of North America
Hymenoptera of North America
Miocene insects of North America
Fossil taxa described in 2009
Insects described in 2009
Fossil bee taxa
Taxa named by Michael S. Engel